The 1927–28 NCAA men's basketball season began in December 1927, progressed through the regular season and conference tournaments, and concluded in March 1928.

Season headlines 

 On April 9, 1927, the Joint Basketball Rules Committee announced a sudden change in dribbling rules, eliminating the continuous dribble that had become legal in the 1909–10 season and replacing it with the rule in use from the 1901–02 through 1908–09 seasons, which restricted each dribble to a single bounce. The committee made the change in the belief that elimination of the continuous dribble would make the game less rough and reward greater team play by encouraging more passing. In response, Kansas head coach Phog Allen founded the National Association of Basketball Coaches, which under his leadership sponsored a nationwide protest against the change. By May 1927, the committee had reversed its decision, and the continuous dribble remained legal.
 After the end of the 1927–28 season, the Missouri Valley Intercollegiate Athletic Association (MVIAA) split into the Big Six Conference and the Missouri Valley Conference in May 1928. Both claimed to be a continuation of the MVIAA.
 In February 1943, the Helms Athletic Foundation retroactively selected Pittsburgh as its national champion for the 1927–28 season.
 In 1995, the Premo-Porretta Power Poll retroactively selected Pittsburgh as its national champion for the 1927–28 season.

Conference membership changes

Regular season

Conference winners and tournaments

Statistical leaders

Awards

Helms College Basketball All-Americans 

The practice of selecting a Consensus All-American Team did not begin until the 1928–29 season. The Helms Athletic Foundation later retroactively selected a list of All-Americans for the 1927–28 season.

Major player of the year awards 

 Helms Player of the Year: Victor Holt, Oklahoma (retroactive selection in 1944)

Coaching changes 

A number of teams changed coaches during the season and after it ended.

References